Steve Donnellan (12 November 1900 – 29 June 1934) was an Australian rules footballer who played with Fitzroy in the Victorian Football League (VFL).

Football
Donnellan came to Fitzroy from Cohuna and played 16 games in his debut season in 1922.

He was the centre half-forward in Fitzroy's premiership team that year but made just 11 more appearances over the next three seasons.

He played with Echuca in the Bendigo Football League after leaving Fitzroy.

Notes

References

External links
 

1900 births
1934 deaths
Australian rules footballers from Victoria (Australia)
Australian Rules footballers: place kick exponents
Fitzroy Football Club players
Fitzroy Football Club Premiership players
Echuca Football Club players
One-time VFL/AFL Premiership players